Eldridge Street is a street in Manhattan's Lower East Side and Chinatown, running from Houston Street south to East Broadway.  Originally called Third Street according to the numbering system for the Delancey Farm Grid, it was named in 1817 for Lt. Joseph C. Eldridge, whose unit was ambushed by Indian allies of the British in Upper Canada during the War of 1812.

Notable locations
  The Eldridge Street Synagogue at 12 Eldridge Street opened in 1887 and served Congregation Kahal Adath Jeshurun.  It is one of the first synagogues in the United States erected by Eastern European Jews (Ashkenazis).  Today the synagogue is the Museum at Eldridge Street.

Eddie Cantor lived at 19 Eldridge Street.

20 Eldridge Street was Hook and Ladder Company Eagle No. 4 in the mid-19th century.  Today the building, once two stories high, now five, is a Buddhist temple.

The New York County Jail, better known as the Eldridge Street Jail, was located at 22 Eldridge Street and operated from 1836 to 1862, when it was replaced by a new jail on Ludlow Street.  The jail building started out as a three-story private home and before becoming a jail was a first a school and then city watchhouse.

American lyricist Ira Gershwin was born at 60 Eldridge Street.

Musicians Thurston Moore and Kim Gordon of the American rock band Sonic Youth lived at 84 Eldridge Street in the 1980s.

105-107 Eldridge Street was the Eldridge Street Police Station from 1869 to 1912.  Danish-American photographer and social reformer Jacob Riis took several photographs of the inmates there and documented their squalid living conditions in his 1890 book How the Other Half Lives.

Gallery

References

Streets in Manhattan
Chinatown, Manhattan
Lower East Side